Mark Meseroll (July 22, 1955 – November 17, 2018) was an American football tackle. He played for the New Orleans Saints in 1978.

He died on November 17, 2018, in Salisbury, North Carolina at age 63.

References

1955 births
2018 deaths
American football tackles
Wesley Wolverines football players
Florida State Seminoles football players
New Orleans Saints players